Zean Cabangis is a Filipino visual artist.

About

Zean Cabangis was born on March 8, 1985, to Benjamin Cabangis, a professor  at the University of the Philippines, College of Fine Arts and Flora  Bajar Cabangis, a Managing Editor at the UP System Information Office,  in Tayabas Quezon, but grew up in Quezon City.

He completed his elementary and high school education at the University of the Philippines Integrated School and his college education at the University of the Philippines. Cabangis graduated from UP with a Bachelor of Fine Art with a major in Painting in 2007 and was awarded the Most Outstanding Thesis of 2006.

Cabangis enjoys creating artwork, and his father's being both a painter and art professor were important factors in his choosing to become an artist. He took basic art classes such as electives during his elementary and high school days and attended an art workshop at UP before taking the talent tests of the University of the Philippines.

Cabangis was an Artist-in-Residence with the Southeast Asia Art Group Exchange Program in Tenggara, Yogyakarta, Indonesia in 2011.

Art
Cabangis uses acrylic and emulsion transfer in his works. He learned this technique as a painting student at the University of the Philippines. Instead of painting the images, this technique allowed Cabangis to build layers and reproduce different photographic images. It is through the use of emulsion transfer that the quality Cabangis looks for in his work is achieved.

Hidden beneath the painted lines, his subject consists of everyday objects and scenes which are mostly reconstructed from his memories.

Recognition

Exhibits

Cabangis has had five solo shows and several group exhibition in Manila-based galleries and has also exhibited in local and international art fairs.

Solo shows

Group exhibits

Other group exhibits were held in Salud Bistro Gallery, Blan Gallery, Kaida Gallery, Cubao Expo, Cultural Center of the Philippines, Boston Gallery, The Forth Gallery, Whitebox Studio, and West Gallery in Quezon City. He also exhibited in local places such as Baguio, Makati, Kamuning in Quezon City, and international spots such as Yogyakarta, Indonesia, and Singapore

Art fairs

References

1995 births
Living people
Filipino artists
People from Tayabas
Artists from Quezon
People from Quezon City